Trent Corney (born March 11, 1993) is a professional Canadian football defensive end and bodybuilder. He was drafted ninth overall by the Blue Bombers in the 2016 CFL Draft and signed with the team on May 24, 2016. He played college football for the Virginia Cavaliers.

References

External links
Winnipeg Blue Bombers bio 

1993 births
Living people
Canadian football defensive linemen
People from Brockville
Players of Canadian football from Ontario
Virginia Cavaliers football players
Winnipeg Blue Bombers players
Canadian players of American football
American football defensive ends